Commander Hamilton McWhorter III (February 8, 1921April 12, 2008) was a United States Navy aviator and a flying ace of World War II, credited with shooting down twelve Japanese aircraft. He was the first Hellcat ace, first USN carrier-based double ace, and the first Grumman F6F Hellcat pilot to achieve double ace status. He flew 89 combat missions during World War II while flying with the VF-9 and VF-12 units. On May 23, 2014, he was also posthumously awarded the American Fighter Aces Congressional Gold Medal, when the United States Congress collectively awarded the gold medal to all flying aces: a navy pilot is depicted on the medal in the upper right.

Early life and education
Hamilton McWhorter III was born in 1921 to a middle-class family. The family lived on a farm. When he was nine years old, his father got him on his first flight, which was in a Ford Tri-Motor. He was enrolled at the University of Georgia from 1939 to 1941. He attended Civilian Pilot Training in 1939 and entered the Navy flight program in August 1941.

Navy career

McWhorter was selected for fighter training and arrived for training in Miami on December 24, 1941. He graduated from flight school on January 28, 1942, and was commissioned as an ensign on February 9. Advancing to carrier training on the F4F Wildcat at Naval Air Station Norfolk, McWhorter joined Fighting Squadron 9 (VF-9), based at East Field on NAS Norfolk, after completing the program in late April. In early October he and the squadron embarked aboard the USS Ranger for Operation Torch, the Allied invasion of Vichy French North Africa. McWhorter flew in an airstrike against Casablanca when the invasion began on November 8. After Vichy French resistance ceased, the Ranger returned to Norfolk. Based at nearby NAS Oceana from December, VF-9 converted to the new F6F-3 Hellcat in early 1943, among the first squadrons to receive them. McWhorter found the Hellcat a "dream to fly" and much superior to the Wildcat. During this period at Norfolk McWhorter met Louise Edel, the daughter of a Navy chaplain, and they married on January 16.

In May 1943 VF-9 departed for the Pacific Theater aboard the newly commissioned carrier USS Essex. He was nicknamed "One Slug" McWhorter after his first kill over Wake Island on October 5, 1943, when McWhorter flew into a formation of Japanese Zeroes and fired one .50-caliber bullet into the plane. The plane exploded and McWhorter earned his first enemy kill. The men in his unit said he was conserving the taxpayers' money by only firing one slug. McWhorter later stated that he only fired one shot because the plane blew up.

On a mission escorting SBD Dauntless dive bombers over Rabaul on November 11, 1943, McWhorter downed two Zeroes. McWhorter's Hellcat was hit several times in the attack, but he was able to land on the Essex. The Hellcat sustained bullet holes on both sides of the fuselage and several that went straight through each wing. During the February 17, 1944, Operation Hailstone airstrikes on Truk, McWhorter downed three Zeroes, bringing his score to ten victories. He thus became the first Hellcat double ace and the first carrier pilot double ace. In his memoirs, McWhorter described the engagement: "My wingman and I ran into three Zekes. The first had a perfect bead on me, but for some reason didn't fire and Bud knocked him down. The other two ran right into my sights, one after the other, inside ten seconds and went down. Less than a mile away another Zero (later identified as "Hamp") was bearing down on me. He could have got me, but strangely, he didn't fire either. I let him have a burst and set him afire."

The Essex arrived at San Francisco on March 10, and her pilots dispersed for a month-long leave. After meeting his parents-in-law at Naval Training Station Sampson and visiting his family in Athens, McWhorter was posted to the reforming VF-12 as one of its veteran cadre. VF-12 was attached to USS Randolph in 1945, and McWhorter claimed two more Japanese aircraft to raise his victory total to 12.

McWhorter was awarded the Distinguished Flying Cross five times in recognition of his actions. He was among the seven original inductees into the Georgia Aviation Hall of Fame when it was established in 1989.

After the war, McWhorter was given command of VF-12, an aviation unit of the United States Navy.

He ended his Navy career as executive officer of Naval Air Station Miramar in 1969 and retired to El Cajon. McWhorter's memoir, coauthored by Jay Stout, was published by Pacifica in 2001 as The First Hellcat Ace.

Affiliations
He was a member of the American Fighter Aces Association, the Distinguished Flying Cross Society, and the Tailhook Association.

Awards

 Permanent Citation for the Gold Star awarded by Secretary of the Navy James Forrestal (1947)
 Georgia Aviation Hall of Fame (1989)
 Congressional Gold Medal awarded to American fighter aces, collectively May 23, 2014

Personal

In January 1943 he married Louise Edel. Together they had 5 children: Donald, Bill, Georgia, Hamilton, and Jon. He retired as a Navy commander in 1969 in El Cajon, California.

See also
 List of World War II aces from the United States
 List of World War II flying aces

Published work

References

Bibliography

Further reading

External links
 CDR Hamilton “Mac” McWhorter III at Find a Grave
 Mud in your Inbox Politifact interview with McWhorter, who denies that he signed a meme/mass email that attacked Bill Clinton and Hillary Clinton   "He said in an e-mail exchange with the Times that he did not write the Gold Star Mothers e-mail, and is tired of hearing about it. He believes someone copied his name from a Web site or from publicity about his memoir The First Hellcat Ace.  His wife, Louise, said, "My husband is a Georgia gentleman. He would never write that about a woman.""
 WW2 Aces Over North Africa: Herbert Ross, Hamilton McWhoter, James Edwards at Museum of Flight, 2006 video

1921 births
2008 deaths
United States Navy personnel of World War II
American World War II flying aces
Aviators from Georgia (U.S. state)
Military personnel from Georgia (U.S. state)
People from Athens, Georgia
Recipients of the Air Medal
Recipients of the Distinguished Flying Cross (United States)
United States Navy pilots of World War II
University of Georgia alumni
Burials at Fort Rosecrans National Cemetery